Martin Lee was an American lawyer and politician from New York.

Life
He was the son of Rev. Andrew Lee D.D. (1745–1832) and Eunice (Hall) Lee (d. 1800). He married Anna Wendell, daughter of State Senator Gerrit Wendell, and they had eleven children.

He was Supervisor of the Town of Granville from 1820 to 1822; and a member of the New York State Assembly (Washington Co.) in 1823.

He was a member of the New York State Senate (4th D.) from 1838 to 1841, sitting in the 61st, 62nd, 63rd and 64th New York State Legislatures.

He was the Judge of the Washington County Court from 1847 to 1851.

Sources

The New York Civil List compiled by Franklin Benjamin Hough (pages 131ff, 143, 200, 287 and 365; Weed, Parsons and Co., 1858)
Lee genealogy

External links

Year of birth missing
Year of death missing
New York (state) state senators
People from Granville, New York
New York (state) Whigs
19th-century American politicians
New York (state) state court judges
Members of the New York State Assembly
Town supervisors in New York (state)